James Leigh Joynes (1824 – 29 June 1908) was an English clergyman and schoolmaster.

Biography 
Joynes was born in Frindsbury, Kent, in 1824. His father was Richard Symonds Joynes, the Rector of Gravesend. He was educated at Eton College, before going on to King's School, Rochester, where he earned a Camden Medal.

He taught at Eton College from 1849 to 1887 and became Lower Master in 1878. Among his pupils were A. C. Swinburne, Sidney Herbert, Lord Kinnaird and the Duke of Argyll. His pupils used the nicknames "Jimmy" or "old Jimmy" to affectionately refer to him. He was notorious for his use of flogging and birching to discipline students.

In 1859, he married Elizabeth Johanne Unger. He was the father of James Leigh Joynes and father-in-law of Henry Stephens Salt.

On his retirement in 1887, a caricature of Joynes brandishing a birch, by Leslie Ward, was published in Vanity Fair.

Joynes died at Tunbridge Wells, Kent, in June 1908.

References 

1824 births
1908 deaths
19th-century Church of England clergy
19th-century English educators
People educated at Eton College
Teachers at Eton College
People educated at King's School, Rochester
People from Frindsbury